Tomislav Prpić (born 10 February 1972) is a Croatian former professional tennis player.

Active on tour in the 1990s, Prpić competed mainly in satellite tournaments but featured in the singles main draw of the 1995 Croatia Open, where he lost his first round match to Álex López Morón in three sets. He was a doubles quarter-finalist at the Croatia Open the following year.

References

External links
 
 

1972 births
Living people
Croatian male tennis players